Gerald Atkins (born 14 May 1938), known as Bill Atkins, is a former English first-class cricketer.  Atkins was a left-handed batsman who bowled leg break.  He was born in Great Missenden, Buckinghamshire.

Atkins made his debut for Buckinghamshire in the 1957 Minor Counties Championship against Oxfordshire.  Atkins served in the British Army, and it was for a Combined Services team that he made his first-class debut for against Warwickshire in 1958.  He played a further first-class match the following season for the team against Somerset.  The season following that, he made his first-class debut for Cambridge University against Surrey.  He played 17 further first-class matches for the University, the last coming against Kent in 1961.  In his 18 first-class matches for the University, Atkins scored 338 runs at a batting average of 11.65, with a high score of 49.

While playing first-class cricket, he also continued to play Minor counties cricket for Buckinghamshire, representing the county to 1972 and making 107 Minor Counties Championship appearances.  He made his List A debut for Buckinghamshire in the 1965 Gillette Cup against Middlesex.  He played 2 further List A matches for the county, both coming in the 1970 Gillette Cup against Bedfordshire and Hampshire.  In his 3 List A matches, he scored 16 runs at an average of 8.00, with a high score of 16.

References

External links

1938 births
Living people
People from Great Missenden
English cricketers
Buckinghamshire cricketers
Combined Services cricketers
Cambridge University cricketers